The Saint Paul and Pacific Railroad (also known as the St. Paul & Pacific Railroad and the SP&P) was a shortline railroad in the state of Minnesota in the United States which existed from 1857 to 1879. Founded as the Minnesota and Pacific Railroad, it was the state's first active railroad. It went bankrupt, and the state changed its name to the Saint Paul and Pacific Railroad.  The SP&P went bankrupt as well. It was taken over by James Jerome Hill and others, who used the railroad as the basis for building the Great Northern Railway.

Early history
In 1857, the territorial legislature of the state of Minnesota issued a charter to the Minnesota and Pacific Railroad to build a standard gauge railway from Stillwater in the east to St. Paul in the west. From St. Paul, the main line would extend to Breckenridge in the west (the state's border with the Dakota Territory), while a branch line would extend to St. Cloud, Crow Wing, and St. Vincent. This was the seventh largest land grant of the 75 given to railroads nationwide between 1850 and 1871.

Construction began in the autumn of 1856, and in 1857 the state backed a $5 million bond issue to support the new rail system. But speculators manipulated the nascent railroad's profits, overcharged it for supplies, and sold off some of its assets. It went bankrupt in 1860, and the new state legislature purchased all of its assets for a mere $1,000.

Saint Paul and Pacific
In 1862, the state legislature reorganized the bankrupt railroad as the St. Paul and Pacific Railroad. That same year,  of track between St. Paul and St. Anthony finally opened. Egbert E. Litchfield bought most of the road's stock, and while the branch line reached Sauk Rapids by 1867 (financed mostly by bonds sold in the Netherlands) little was accomplished on the main line. Only  of track had been laid as of 1865. The railroad built almost no more track between 1867 and 1871. Nonetheless, it heavily promoted the construction of towns every  along its length, and was the leading railroad helping to "colonize" Minnesota.

In December 1870, the Northern Pacific Railway purchased the SP&P. But the Northern Pacific went bankrupt in the Panic of 1873, and E. Darwin Litchfield (Egbert's brother) bought the SP&P back from the bigger road.
Dutch investors held most of the road's stock, and forced Litchfield to allow a receiver to manage the system. For three more years, little was done by the receiver.

But James J. Hill, who ran steamboats on the Red River, knew that the SP&P owned very valuable land grants and saw the potential of the railroad. Hill convinced John S. Kennedy (a New York City banker who had represented the Dutch bondholders), Norman Kittson (Hill's friend and a wealthy fur trader), Donald Smith (a Montreal banker and executive with the Hudson's Bay Company), and George Stephen (Smith's cousin and a wealthy railroad executive) to invest $5.5 million in purchasing the railroad. On March 13, 1878, the Dutch formally signed an agreement transferring their bonds to the investors group and giving them control of the railroad.

To finance construction of the SP&P, the road issued bonds that allowed the bearer to receive up to $10,000 per mile of track completed, but only if the line was finished. In February 1879, the group bought out the Litchfields with cash and bonds in the new company.
The SP&P showed a $500,000 profit for 1878, and in March 1879 two different courts finally approved the company's emergence from bankruptcy.

Demise and future ownership
On May 23, 1879, the key investors in the railroad formed a new company, the St. Paul, Minneapolis and Manitoba Railway (StPM&M), to take over the assets of the SP&P. It did so in June 1879, bringing an end to the existence of the St. Paul and Pacific.

On September 18, 1889, Hill changed the name of the Minneapolis and St. Cloud Railway (a railroad which existed primarily on paper, but which held extensive land grants throughout the Midwest and Pacific Northwest) to the Great Northern Railway. On February 1, 1890, he transferred ownership of the StPM&M, Montana Central Railway, and other rail systems he owned to the Great Northern.

Today, Progressive Rail Corp. runs freight trains in Santa Cruz County under the same name St. Paul and Pacific and with the same reporting marks Sp&p.

Footnotes

Bibliography
Dreiser, Theodore. Tragic America. London: Constable, 1931.
Fitzsimmons, Bernard. 150 Years of North American Railroads. Hadley Woods, Hertfordshire, U.K.: Winchmore, 1982.
Ingham, John N. "Litchfield, Paul Weeks." In Biographical Dictionary of American Business Leaders. Westport, Conn.: Greenwood Press, 1983.
Lovoll, Odd S. Norwegians on the Prairie: Ethnicity and the Development of the Country Town. St. Paul: Minnesota Historical Society, 2007.
 
Smalley, Eugene Virgil. History of the Northern Pacific Railroad. New York: G.P. Putnam's Sons, 1883.
Yenne, Bill. Great Northern Empire Builder. St. Paul, Minn.: MBI Publishing, 2005.

Railway companies established in 1857
Railway companies disestablished in 1879
Defunct Minnesota railroads
Predecessors of the Great Northern Railway (U.S.)
1857 establishments in Minnesota Territory
American companies disestablished in 1879
American companies established in 1857